Sabah Mirza Mahmud (1943–2005) was an Iraqi military colonel and the first personal companion of former Iraqi president Saddam Hussein.

Early life
Sabah was one of Saddam's old friends, and began his violent partisan duties since the age of 16. In his youth, he was known in his neighborhood (Adhamiyah) as a boxer.
When he was a student, he joined General Union Students in the Republic of Iraq, Sabah graduated from Languages Institute, though he stayed unemployed for some time until Saddam recruited him as his bodyguard.

Career

Service under Saddam Hussein
His Code Name was Lieutenant Yusif. In preparation for the coup of 17 July Revolution 1968 Sabah was assigned to lead one of the groups that were deployed to patrol some streets of Baghdad.  He served Saddam as his bodyguard for over 22 years. He received quick military promotions through the ranks due to his closeness to Saddam Hussein. During the Iran–Iraq War, Sabah attended night shifts at the headquarters of Central Command, where Saddam used to attend one hour a day to be briefed on the military operations.

U.S invasion
Sabah was captured in 2003 by American occupying forces to be questioned about Saddam's hiding place, and he was soon released as there was no evidence of his knowledge thereof, but a weapons cache was seized from his farm.

Sport
He was elected as vice chairman of National Olympic Committee of Iraq, he was also appointed as Chairman of the Iraqi Football Association to assert the new regime authority over the nation’s favorite's sport, at the time when  Iraqi Team became one of the most successful national teams in Asia, he also was appointed as the president of Al-Shabab sport club.  ٍ

Farming
Sabah had a 10-Dunam farm in Jurf Al Naddaf area southeast of Baghdad, which he claimed that it was an unproductive vacant land, and he restored it and thereafter owned it officially.

References

1943 births
2005 deaths